

Excavations
 Francis Llewellyn Griffith begins a 4-year series of excavations in Nubia.
 Edgar Lee Hewett begins a 4-year project at Quiriguá.
 Antonios Keramopoulos excavates the temple of Apollo in Thebes, Greece.
 St Piran's Oratory, Perranzabuloe, Cornwall, England.
 Coldrum Long Barrow in south east England.
 Jesús Carballo begins the first excavations at the archaeological site of Atapuerca in northern Spain.
 Robert Ranulph Marett begins a 4-year project at the Paleolithic site of La Cotte de St Brelade on Jersey, Channel Islands.

Finds
 December – 'Meroë Head' looted from a bronze statue of Roman emperor Augustus buried in the Kushite site of Meroë in modern Sudan, excavated by John Garstang.

Events
 United Fruit Company purchases land in Guatemala including the Maya site of Quiriguá; 30 acres (120,000 m2) including and around the ruins are set aside as an archaeological zone.
 The National Museums of Kenya, a governmental body maintaining several museums and monuments in Kenya (with headquarters in Nairobi), is founded by the East Africa Natural History Society.

Births
 February 13 – Ignacio Bernal, Mexican archaeologist (d. 1992).
 May 3 – Anne Strachan Robertson, Scottish archaeologist and numismatist (d. 1997).
 May 28 – Stuart Piggott, English archaeologist (d. 1996).
 July 10 – Wilhelmina Feemster Jashemski, American archaeologist (d. 2007).
 August 5 – Jacquetta Hawkes, British archaeologist (d. 1996).

Deaths
 May 26 – Cyrus Thomas, American ethnologist and archaeologist (b. 1825).
 June 22 – Richard Wetherill, American archaeologist (b. 1858).
 August 12 – Adolf Michaelis, German classical scholar (b. 1835).
 August 23 – Jakob Messikommer, Swiss archaeologist (b. 1828).

See also
 Pompeii

References

Archaeology
Archaeology by year